Przybyszewski (feminine Przybyszewska) is a Polish surname. Notable people include:

 Bolesław Przybyszewski (1892–1937), Soviet teacher, musicologist, and head of the Moscow Conservatory
 Sebastian Przybyszewski, Polish footballer
 Stanisław Przybyszewski (1868–1927), Polish novelist, dramatist, and poet
 Stanisława Przybyszewska, Polish dramatist

See also 
 Przybyszewski Island
 Roland Pryzbylewski, a character on The Wire

Polish-language surnames